Jerzmanowice  is a village in Kraków County, Lesser Poland Voivodeship, in southern Poland. It is the seat of the gmina (administrative district) called Gmina Jerzmanowice-Przeginia.

References

Jerzmanowice